Miss Universe Ireland 2010 was held on June 20, 2010 in the Abbey Theatre in Dublin. There was county pageants from March to June 1. The winner represented Ireland at Miss Universe 2010.

Results

Special Awards

Miss Photogenic  -  Rozanna Purcell (South Dublin)
Miss Congeniality  -  Faye Rooney  (Fingal)
Miss Fashion  - Maedhbh Kelly  (Cork)
Miss Internet  -  Rozanna Purcell (South Dublin)

Contestants

External links
Official Website
Offiacial Bebo's Page

Miss Universe Ireland
2010 in Ireland
2010 beauty pageants